Tommaso Vaccina (born 5 April 1980) is an Italian male mountain runner, world champion at the World Long Distance Mountain Running Championships (2015).

Biography
Vaccina also won three medals at senior level with the national team at the World Mountain Running Championships.

He won Zermatt marathon in 2015.

National titles
He won a national championship at individual senior level.
Italian Vertical Kilometer Championships
Vertical kilometer: 2014

See also
 Italy at the World Mountain Running Championships

References

External links
 
 
 Tommaso Vaccina at FIDAL 
 

1980 births
Living people
Sportspeople from Pavia
Italian male long-distance runners
Italian male marathon runners
Italian male mountain runners
World Long Distance Mountain Running Championships winners
21st-century Italian people